Doug Boyer is a former American racing driver. He competed in the Indy Lights series from 1994 to 1996 for Summit Motorsports with Red Line Oil sponsorship. He finished 8th in series points in 1994 and 4th in 1995. He only competed part-time in 1996 and finished 23rd in the championship. His best finish was 2nd place in the 1995 Vancouver race.

Complete motorsports results

American Open-Wheel racing results
(key) (Races in bold indicate pole position, races in italics indicate fastest race lap)

American Continental Championship results

USAC FF2000 Western Division Championship

Indy Lights

References

American racing drivers
Indy Lights drivers
Living people
Year of birth missing (living people)
U.S. F2000 National Championship drivers